Bonamia pannosa is a herb in the family Convolvulaceae.

It blooms between January to October and produces purple-blue flowers.

It is found on floodplains and along watercourses in the Kimberley and Pilbara regions of Western Australia where it grows in sandy soils.

References

pannosa
Plants described in 1893